The second Rugby League Tri-Nations tournament (known as the Gillette Tri-Nations due to sponsorship) was contested between 16 October and 27 November of 2004. The format of the competition differed from the previous event in that the teams played each other twice, rather than once, prior to the final.

The tournament final of the tournament was predicted by some to be a close affair, with the British team heralded as slight favourites after finishing at the top of the league table. Instead, it was a one-sided match as Australia produced their best performance of the tournament. The game was effectively over by half-time when Australia led by 38–0.

Participating teams 
Each team was to play the other three twice during the round robin tournament. The top two finishing teams would then contest the final.

Officials 
One referee from each participating nation was appointed to control matches in the Tri-Nations:
  Tim Mander (2 matches)
  Russell Smith (3 matches)
  Glen Black (2 matches)

Venues 
The games were played at the following venues in New Zealand and England.

Final 
The tournament final was played in Leeds.

Results

Tournament matches

Tournament standings

Final

Player statistics

Non-series Tests 
During the series, Australia and New Zealand both played an additional test match against France.

Additional Matches 
A one-off match was also played between an ANZAC side made up of touring Australian and New Zealand players and a Cumbria side.

On their way back to Australia just four days after the Tri-Nations Final, the Kangaroos played a match, known as the Liberty Bell Cup against the USA at the Franklin Field in Philadelphia. Played in quarters instead of halves, and on a synthetic field that was the size of a Grid iron field, the American's shocked the Australians by racing to an 18–0 lead nearing half time and actually went into the long break with a 24–6 lead. They managed to keep their lead until late in the game when the fitness of the Australians, who had bombed numerous try scoring opportunities through the game, told and the Kangaroos overhauled the home team to win 36–24.

References

External links 
 2004 Tri-Nations, Information

Tri-Nations
Rugby League Tri-Nations
Tri
Tri
International rugby league competitions hosted by the United Kingdom